Abraham Mateo is the debut album of the Spanish singer Abraham Mateo, put out by EMI Music Spain on December 4, 2009. Since his first appearances in the television show Menuda Noche on the Canal Sur TV of Andalucia, a friend of Abraham's family posted in YouTube videos of his performances, which soon enjoyed great popularity and caught the attention of executives of EMI Music Spain. Early 2009, when he was ten, Mateo signed a recording contract with EMI Music Spain and released in December of the same year his debut self-titled album.

The album, recorded in Madrid and produced by Jacobo Calderon and Jose Luis de la Peña, contains twelve songs. Seven tracks were composed by Calderon himself, including the ballads "Vuelve conmigo, "Un amor como los de antes", "Destronado", "Magia" and "Te Amaré", the ranchera "Lágrimas de amor", and the pop song "Volvería". Four tracks are covers of popular Latin songs such as Raphael's "Cuando tu no estas", Alejandro Sanz's "Los dos cogidos de la mano", Laura Pausini's "La soledad" and Luis Fonsi's "Imaginame sin ti". The album includes a duet with the French teen singer Caroline Costa, the runner-up in the 2008 edition of the television contest Incroyable Talent, the French version of America's Got Talent. Abraham and Caroline recorded for the album a Spanish version of Badfinger's "Without you", the song has also been covered with great success by  Mariah Carey. "Vuelve conmigo" is the album's single.

To promote the album,  Mateo toured through several cities in Spain and performed in Spanish radio and television shows, including the popular television programs Mas que baile, Tu si que vales, the show of Maria Teresa Campos, and the Christmas Eve Special of the Telecinco channel.

Track listing
 "Vuelve conmigo" (Jacobo Calderón, Fernando Calleja) – 3:20
 "Destronado" (Jacobo Calderón) – 3:51
 "Los dos cogidos de la mano" (Alejandro Sanz) – 5:14
 "Un amor como los de antes" (Jacobo Calderón) – 3:47
 "Magia" (Jacobo Calderón) – 4:05
 "Imagíname sin tí" (Mark Portmann, Rudy Pérez) – 4:08
 "Volvería" (Jacobo Calderón) – 3:20
 "Without you" (Peter Ham, Tom Evans) duet with Caroline Costa – 3:52
 "Lágrimas de amor" (Jacobo Calderón) – 3:52
 "Te amaré" (Jacobo Calderón) – 3:45
 "La soledad" (Pietro Cremonesi, Angelo Valsiglio, Federico Cavalli, Spanish version: Badia) – 3:48
 "Cuando tú no estás" (Manuel Alejandro) – 3:44

References

External links
 Abraham Mateo Official Website
 Abraham Mateo YouTube Channel
 Abraham Mateo VEVO

2009 debut albums
Abraham Mateo albums